Blastobasis murcyae is a moth in the family Blastobasidae that is endemic to New Caledonia.

The forewings are pale brown intermixed with dark brown and white scales. The hindwings are pale greyish brown.

Etymology
The species is named in honour of C. Murray Adams and Lucy G. Adams.

References

Moths described in 2002
Endemic fauna of New Caledonia
Blastobasis